Brian or Bryan Fowler may refer to:

Brian Fowler (cyclist) (born 1962), New Zealand cyclist
Brian Fowler (racing driver) (born 1971), Jamaican race car driver
Brian Fowler (Emmerdale), fictitious television character
Brian Fowler (MP) (fl. 1558) for Staffordshire (UK Parliament constituency)
Bryan Fowler (1898–1987), British polo player